Vučo is a surname. Notable people with the surname include:

Biljana Kovačević-Vučo (1952–2010), Serbian activist
Olivera Vučo (born 1940), Serbian actress, singer, and writer

See also
Vučko (surname)

Serbian surnames